Susan Kathleen Foley  (born 3 March 1949) is an Australian historian who specialises in French history, particularly in relation to French gender history, feminism and socialism. From 1992 to 2000, she published under her married name of Susan K. Grogan.

Early life and education
Foley was born in Sydney in 1949 to Lawrence Foley, a railway worker, and Josephine Gooley, a hospital bookkeeper. She was educated at St Mary's Dominican Convent in Maitland, and then studied teaching at Catholic Teachers' College in North Sydney and worked as a secondary school teacher.

In 1971, Foley moved to Karratha, Western Australia where she began studying for a Bachelor of Arts by correspondence at the University of Western Australia. She completed the degree with first class honours at Murdoch University, where she also completed a PhD in 1986.

Academic career
Foley lectured for a year at Murdoch, then moved to New Zealand to take a role lecturing in history at the Victoria University of Wellington in 1987. She was promoted to senior lecturer in 1993, and was head of the university's history department twice. In 2002, she became an associate professor in history. In 2006, she returned to Australia where she joined the University of Melbourne as Principal Fellow in History.

Works

References

1949 births
Living people
Australian historians
Australian women historians
Academic staff of the University of Melbourne
Academic staff of the Victoria University of Wellington
University of Melbourne women
Murdoch University alumni
Fellows of the Australian Academy of the Humanities